Distorsio is a genus of medium-sized sea snails, marine gastropod mollusks in the family Personidae, the Distortio snails.

Species
Species within the genus Distorsio include:

 Distorsio anus (Linnaeus, 1758)
 Distorsio burgessi Lewis, 1972
 † Distorsio cancellina (Lamarck, 1803) 
 Distorsio clathrata (Lamarck, 1816)
 Distorsio constricta (Broderip, 1833)
 Distorsio decipiens (Reeve, 1844)
 Distorsio decussata (Valenciennes, 1832)
 † Distorsio djunggranganensis (K. Martin, 1916) 
 Distorsio euconstricta Beu, 1987
 Distorsio globosa Nolf, 2014
 Distorsio graceiellae Parth, 1989
 Distorsio habei Lewis, 1972
 Distorsio jenniernestae Emerson & Piech, 1992
 Distorsio kurzi Petuch & Harasewych, 1980
 Distorsio mcgintyi Emerson & Puffer, 1953
 Distorsio minoruohnishii Parth, 1989
 Distorsio muehlhaeusseri Parth, 1990
 Distorsio parvimpedita Beu, 1998
 Distorsio perdistorta Fulton, 1938
 Distorsio reticularis (Linnaeus, 1758)
 Distorsio ridens (Reeve, 1844) 
 Distorsio smithi (von Maltzan, 1884)
 Distorsio somalica Parth, 1990

Species which are synonyms or were incorrectly placed in the genus Distorsio:
 Distorsio acuta Perry, 1811 accepted as Distorsio reticularis (Linnaeus, 1758)
 Distorsio arcularia Röding, 1798 accepted as Nassarius arcularia arcularia (Linnaeus, 1758)
 Distorsio communis Röding, 1798 accepted as Nassarius stolatus (Gmelin, 1791)
 Distorsio francesae Iredale, 1931 accepted as Distorsio reticularis (Linnaeus, 1758)
 Distorsio horrida Kuroda & Habe in Habe, 1961 accepted as Distorsio perdistorta Fulton, 1938
 Distorsio lewisi Beu, 1978 accepted as Distorsionella lewisi (Beu, 1978)
 Distorsio mcgintyi Emerson & Puffer, 1953: synonym of Distorsio constricta mcgintyi Emerson & Puffer, 1953
 Distorsio muricina Röding, 1798 accepted as Gutturnium muricinum (Röding, 1798)
 Distorsio plicata Röding, 1798 accepted as Nassarius arcularia plicatus (Röding, 1798)
 Distorsio pusilla Pease, 1861 accepted as Distorsomina pusilla (Pease, 1861)
 Distorsio reticulata Röding, 1798 accepted as Distorsio reticularis (Linnaeus, 1758)
 Distorsio robinsoni Petuch, 1987 accepted as Distorsio clathrata (Lamarck, 1816)
 Distorsio ventricosa Kronenberg, 1994: synonym of Distorsio muehlhaeusseri'' Parth, 1990

References

Personidae